Silver number may refer to:
 Silver ratio 1 + 
 Plastic number, the real root of the cubic equation 
 Gold-to-silver ratio